The labioscrotal swellings (genital swellings or labioscrotal folds) are paired structures in the human embryo that represent the final stage of development of the caudal end of the external genitals before sexual differentiation. In both males and females, the two swellings merge:
 In the female, they become the posterior labial commissure. The sides of the genital tubercle grow backward as the genital swellings, which ultimately form the labia majora; the tubercle itself becomes the mons pubis. In contrast, the labia minora are formed by the urogenital folds.
 In the male, they become the scrotum.

References

External links
 "Development of Male External Genitalia", at mcgill.ca
 "Development of Female External Genitalia", at mcgill.ca
 Diagram at mhhe.com
 
 

Embryology of urogenital system
Scrotum